House is a term commonly used to refer to a number of legislative bodies.

Specific examples include:

Lower house, one of two chambers of a bicameral legislature
House of Commons, the elected lower house of the bicameral parliaments of the United Kingdom and Canada
House of Representatives, a name used for legislative bodies in many countries
United States House of Representatives
Upper house, one of two chambers of a bicameral legislature
House of Lords, the upper house of the Parliament of the United Kingdom
House of Burgesses, the first elected legislative assembly in the New World, established in the Colony of Virginia

See also
Debate chamber